The 2004 Utah Democratic presidential primary was held on February 24 in the U.S. state of Utah as one of the Democratic Party's statewide nomination contests ahead of the 2004 presidential election.

Results

References

Utah
Democratic primary
2004